Uroš Petrović (born 8 April 1967) is a Serbian writer.

Biography
Petrović is born in Gornji Milanovac, Socialist Republic of Serbia within Yugoslavia, now Serbia. Exercising one’s brain, meeting with the wondrous, strange, but also terrifying, the unbridled imagination and special humor in his books are all also becoming increasingly popular reading for adults.
He is best known for his unusual novels, Riddle Tales I - V (Original title – Zagonetne priče) serial, Mysteries of Ginkgo Street (Original title – Misterije Ginkove ulice) and the first Serbian horror for children  The Fifth Butterfly (Original title – Peti leptir). Dark Secrets of Ginkgo Street and Marta's Great Mysterious Adventure are also an innovative form - novels made of riddles. Petrovic spurred the nation to think in the “Labyrinth” quiz as the Creator of the Labyrinth character and the most serious obstacle for competitors, broadcast by Radio Television of Serbia. Awarded for books and photographs. Chairman of Serbian Mensa (2008. - 2013.). Founder of Mensa World Photo Cup. 
Co-author of NTC System of learning and author of Riddle questions concept.

Bibliography
Aven (2003, 2005)
Stories From Other Side (2004)
Riddle Tales (2006)
Riddle Tales II (2006)
The Fifth Butterfly (2007)
Riddle Tales III (2007)
Mysteries of Ginkgo Street (2008)
Riddle Tales IV (2009)
Dark Secrets of Ginkgo Street (2011)
Riddle Tales V (2012)
Children Of Bestragija (2013)
Secret Skills of Marta Smart (2013)
Marta's Great Mysterious Adventure (2014)
Caravan of Wonders (2016)
Marta Smart and Ferry of Riddles (2016)
The Story of Yang (2017)
Someone's Moved Into That Old Mansion (2018)
Scary, scary book (2019)
Quest of Riddles (2019)
Camels Are Fat (2020)
Quest of Riddles 2 (2021)
Fairy Tales - The First Seven (2022)

Filmography 
The Fifth Butterfly (2014) writer

Awards 

ATIPIKA AWARD 2005 First Prize and The best author of unusual literature
NEVEN AWARD 2006 for Riddle Tales and Riddle Tales II 
DOSITEJ AWARD 2006 for Riddle Tales and Riddle Tales II 
RADE OBRENOVIC AWARD 2007 for the best novel for children The Fifth Butterfly
FEATHER OF DOSITEJ AWARD 2007 for the best book Riddle Tales III
GORDANA BRAJOVIC AWARD 2008 for the best book Mysteries of Ginkgo Street
NEVEN AWARD 2008 for the best book of popular science Mysteries of Ginkgo Street
ESTROVERSO AWARD 2009 for the best translation to Italian language Mysteries of Ginkgo Street, translated by Brunella Anastasi and Valentina Sileo
GOLDEN BADGE 2009 of Cultural and Educational Community of Serbia for contribution to national culture 
ZMAJ CHILDREN GAMES AWARD 2011 for outstanding contribution to contemporary expression in literature for children
FEATHER OF DOSITEJ AWARD 2011 for the best book Dark Secrets of Ginkgo Street
FEATHER OF DOSITEJ AWARD 2012 for the best book Riddle Tales V
RADE OBRENOVIC AWARD 2013 for the best novel for children Children of Bestragija
PLAVI CUPERAK 2017 for the best book Caravan of Wonders 
NEVEN AWARD 2017 for the best book Caravan of Wonders
SILVER GASHA'S FEATHER AWARD International Festival of Humor for Children 2018 for the most humorous book The Story of Yang
JEDI KNIGHT Džedajkon 2018 Honorific for fantasy literature and social activism
KNIGHT OF SERBIA 2021 kulturne svečanosti
THE BEST BOOK FOR CHILDREN of International Book Fair Novi Sad 2003 for Fairy Tales - The First Seven

Original Board Games 

Marta's Mysterious Box 2016 Good Toy Award by Friends of Children of Serbia
Mysterious Dominoes 2017
Dum Dum Dum 2018 Good Toy Award by Friends of Children of Serbia
Fairy Tale Workshop - Castle 2020 Grand Prix for a toy with a purpose
Fairy Tale Workshop - Waterfall 2020 Grand Prix for a toy with a purpose
Fairy Tale Workshop - Rainbow 2020 Grand Prix for a toy with a purpose
Fairy Tale Balance Game 2021 Good Toy Award by Friends of Children of Serbia Grand Prix for a toy with a purpose

External links
 
 Uros Petrovic's Site
 Uros Petrovic / Laguna Publisher's Site
 Uros Petrovic's Photo Site
 Trailer for book Dark Secrets of Ginkgo Street
 Trailer for book Children Of Bestragija
 Trailer for book Marta's Great Mysterious Adventure
 Interview for National Review Serbia 2014

References 

1967 births
Living people
Serbian novelists
Serbian science fiction writers
Serbian photographers
People from Gornji Milanovac
Serbian fantasy writers
Mensans